R rating may refer to:

 R rating, a rating of the Canadian Home Video Rating System
 R rating, a rating of the Korea Media Rating Board
 R rating (Motion Picture Association), a rating of the Motion Picture Association film rating system
 Restricted ratings of the  Movie and Television Review and Classification Board in the Philippines
 Restricted ratings of the Office of Film and Literature Classification in New Zealand
 R18 (British Board of Film Classification), a rating by the British Board of Film Classification usually signifying hardcore pornography
 R18+, a rating of the Australian Classification Board
 R18 rating, a rating of Eirin in Japan

See also
18 rating
M for Mature
Mature content
R. Rated
R-value (disambiguation)
R18 (disambiguation)
Rated R (disambiguation)